Upstyledown is the second studio album by Australian punk band 28 Days produced by Kalju Tonuma. It was released in July 2000 and debuted at No. 1 on the Australian ARIA Charts and was certified platinum.

At the ARIA Music Awards of 2001, the album was nominated for Breakthrough Artist – Album, losing out to The Avalanches' Since I Left You.

Track listing

Charts

Weekly charts

Year-end charts

Certifications

Release history

See also
 List of number-one albums of 2000 (Australia)

References

2000 albums
28 Days (band) albums